Rosamaria is a given name. Notable people with the name include:

 Rosamaria Montibeller (born 1994), Brazilian volleyball player
 Rosamaria Murtinho (born 1935), Brazilian actress
 Rosamaría Roffiel (born 1945), Mexican poet, novelist, journalist and editor